

Events

Pre-1600
1138 – Lý Anh Tông is enthroned as emperor of Vietnam at the age of two, beginning a 37-year reign.
1499 – The Catholicon, written in 1464 by Jehan Lagadeuc in Tréguier, is published; this is the first Breton dictionary as well as the first French dictionary.
1556 – Second Battle of Panipat: Fighting begins between the forces of Hem Chandra Vikramaditya, the Hindu king at Delhi and the forces of the Muslim emperor Akbar.

1601–1900
1605 – Gunpowder Plot: Guy Fawkes is arrested in the cellars of the Houses of Parliament, where he had planted gunpowder in an attempt to blow up the building and kill King James I of England.
1688 – Prince William III of Orange lands with a Dutch fleet at Brixham to challenge the rule of King James II of England (James VII of Scotland).
1757 – Seven Years' War: Frederick the Great defeats the allied armies of France and the Holy Roman Empire at the Battle of Rossbach.
1768 – The Treaty of Fort Stanwix is signed, the purpose of which is to adjust the boundary line between Indian lands and white settlements set forth in the Royal Proclamation of 1763 in the Thirteen Colonies.
1780 – French-American forces under Colonel LaBalme are defeated by Miami Chief Little Turtle.
1811 – Salvadoran priest José Matías Delgado rings the bells of La Merced church in San Salvador, calling for insurrection and launching the 1811 Independence Movement.
1828 – Greek War of Independence: The French Morea expedition to recapture Morea (now the Peloponnese) ends when the last Ottoman forces depart the peninsula.
1862 – American Civil War: Abraham Lincoln removes George B. McClellan as commander of the Army of the Potomac.
  1862   – American Indian Wars: In Minnesota, 303 Dakota warriors are found guilty of rape and murder of whites and are sentenced to death. Thirty-eight are ultimately hanged and the others reprieved.
1872 – Women's suffrage in the United States: In defiance of the law, suffragist Susan B. Anthony votes for the first time, and is later fined $100.
1895 – George B. Selden is granted the first U.S. patent for an automobile.
1898 – Negrese nationalists revolt against Spanish rule and establish the short-lived Republic of Negros.

1901–present
1911 – After declaring war on the Ottoman Empire on September 29, 1911, Italy annexes Tripoli and Cyrenaica.
1912 – Woodrow Wilson is elected the 28th President of the United States, defeating incumbent William Howard Taft.
1913 – King Otto of Bavaria is deposed by his cousin, Prince Regent Ludwig, who assumes the title Ludwig III.
1914 – World War I: France and the British Empire declare war on the Ottoman Empire.
1916 – The Kingdom of Poland is proclaimed by the Act of 5th November of the emperors of Germany and Austria-Hungary.
  1916   – The Everett massacre takes place in Everett, Washington as political differences lead to a shoot-out between the Industrial Workers of the World organizers and local police.
1917 – Lenin calls for the October Revolution.
  1917   – Tikhon is elected the Patriarch of Moscow and of the Russian Orthodox Church.
1925 – Secret agent Sidney Reilly, the first "super-spy" of the 20th century, is executed by the OGPU, the secret police of the Soviet Union.
1940 – World War II: The British armed merchant cruiser  is sunk by the German pocket battleship .
  1940   – Franklin D. Roosevelt is the first and only President of the United States to be elected to a third term.
1943 – World War II: Bombing of the Vatican.
1950 – Korean War: British and Australian forces from the 27th British Commonwealth Brigade successfully halted the advancing Chinese 117th Division during the Battle of Pakchon.
1955 – After being destroyed in World War II, the rebuilt Vienna State Opera reopens with a performance of Beethoven's Fidelio.
1956 – Suez Crisis: British and French paratroopers land in Egypt after a week-long bombing campaign. 
1968 – Richard Nixon is elected as 37th President of the United States.
1970 – The Military Assistance Command, Vietnam reports the lowest weekly American soldier death toll in five years (24).
1983 – The Byford Dolphin diving bell accident kills five and leaves one severely injured.
1986 – ,  and  visit Qingdao, China; the first US naval visit to China since 1949.
1990 – Rabbi Meir Kahane, founder of the far-right Kach movement, is shot dead after a speech at a New York City hotel.
1991 – Tropical Storm Thelma causes flash floods in the Philippine city of Ormoc, killing more than 4,900 people.
1995 – André Dallaire attempts to assassinate Prime Minister Jean Chrétien of Canada. He is thwarted when the Prime Minister's wife locks the door.
1996 – Pakistani President Farooq Leghari dismisses the government of Prime Minister Benazir Bhutto and dissolves the National Assembly.
  1996   – Bill Clinton is reelected President of the United States.
2006 – Saddam Hussein, the former president of Iraq, and his co-defendants Barzan Ibrahim al-Tikriti and Awad Hamed al-Bandar, are sentenced to death in the al-Dujail trial for their roles in the 1982 massacre of 148 Shia Muslims.
2007 – China's first lunar satellite, Chang'e 1, goes into orbit around the Moon.
  2007   – The Android mobile operating system is unveiled by Google.
2009 – U.S. Army Major Nidal Hasan murders 13 and wounds 32 at Fort Hood, Texas in the deadliest mass shooting at a U.S. military installation.
2013 – India launches the Mars Orbiter Mission, its first interplanetary probe.
2015 – An iron ore tailings dam bursts in the Brazilian state of Minas Gerais, flooding a valley, causing mudslides in the nearby village of Bento Rodrigues and causing at least 17 deaths and two missing.
  2015   – Rona Ambrose takes over after Stephen Harper as the Leader of the Conservative Party of Canada.
2017 – Devin Patrick Kelley kills 26 and injures 22 in a church in Sutherland Springs, Texas.
2021 – The Astroworld Festival crowd crush results in 10 deaths and 25 people being hospitalized

Births

Pre-1600
1271 – Ghazan, Mongol ruler of the Ilkhanate (d. 1304)
1436 – Richard Grey, 3rd Earl of Tankerville, Earl of Tankerville, 1450–1460 (d. 1466)
1494 – Hans Sachs, German poet and playwright (d. 1576)
1549 – Philippe de Mornay, French theologian and author (d. 1623)
1592 – Charles Chauncy, English-American pastor, theologian, and academic (d. 1672)

1601–1900
1607 – Anna Maria van Schurman, Dutch painter (d. 1678)
1613 – Isaac de Benserade, French poet and educator (d. 1691)
1615 – Ibrahim of the Ottoman Empire (d. 1648)
1666 – Attilio Ariosti, Italian viola player and composer (d. 1729)
1667 – Christoph Ludwig Agricola, German painter (d. 1719)
1688 – Louis Bertrand Castel, French mathematician and philosopher (d. 1757)
1701 – Pietro Longhi, Venetian painter and educator (d. 1785)
1705 – Louis-Gabriel Guillemain, French violinist and composer (d. 1770)
1715 – John Brown, English author and playwright (d. 1766)
1722 – William Byron, 5th Baron Byron, English lieutenant and politician (d. 1798)
1739 – Hugh Montgomerie, 12th Earl of Eglinton, Scottish composer and politician, Lord Lieutenant of Ayrshire (d. 1819)
1742 – Richard Cosway, English painter (d. 1821)
1789 – William Bland, Australian surgeon and politician (d. 1868)
1818 – Benjamin Butler, American general, lawyer, and politician, 33rd Governor of Massachusetts (d. 1893)
1835 – Moritz Szeps, Ukrainian-Austrian journalist and publisher (d. 1902)
1846 – Duncan Gordon Boyes, English soldier, recipient of the Victoria Cross (d. 1869)
1850 – Ella Wheeler Wilcox, American author and poet (d. 1919)
1851 – Charles Dupuy, French academic and politician, 60th Prime Minister of France (d. 1923)
1854 – Alphonse Desjardins, Canadian journalist and businessman, co-founded Desjardins Group (d. 1920)
  1854   – Paul Sabatier, French chemist and academic, Nobel Prize laureate (d. 1941)
1855 – Eugene V. Debs, American union leader and politician (d. 1926)
  1855   – Léon Teisserenc de Bort, French meteorologist and climatologist (d. 1913)
1857 – Ida Tarbell, American journalist, author, reformer, and educator (d. 1944)
1870 – Chittaranjan Das, Indian lawyer and politician (d. 1925)
1873 – Edwin Flack, Australian tennis player and runner (d. 1935)
1879 – Otto Wahle, Austrian-American swimmer and coach (d. 1963)
1881 – George A. Malcolm, American lawyer and jurist (d. 1961)
1883 – P Moe Nin, Burmese author and translator (d. 1940)
1884 – James Elroy Flecker, English author, poet, and playwright (d. 1915)
1885 – Will Durant, American historian and philosopher (d. 1981)
1886 – Sadae Inoue, Japanese general (d. 1961)
1887 – Paul Wittgenstein, Austrian-American pianist and educator (d. 1961)
1890 – Jan Zrzavý, Czech painter and illustrator (d. 1977)
1892 – J. B. S. Haldane, English-Indian geneticist and biologist (d. 1964)
  1892   – John Alcock, captain in the Royal Navy and the Royal Air Force (d. 1919)
1893 – Raymond Loewy, French-American engineer and designer (d. 1986)
1894 – Beardsley Ruml, American economist and statistician (d. 1960)
1895 – Walter Gieseking, French-German pianist and composer (d. 1956)
  1895   – Charles MacArthur, American playwright and screenwriter (d. 1956)
1899 – Margaret Atwood Judson, American historian and author (d. 1991)
1900 – Natalie Schafer, American actress (d. 1991)
  1900   – Ethelwynn Trewavas, British ichthyologist, over a dozen fish species named in her honor (d. 1993)

1901–present
1901 – Etta Moten Barnett, American actress and singer (d. 2004)
  1901   – Martin Dies, Jr., American lawyer, judge and politician (d. 1972)
  1901   – Eddie Paynter, English cricketer (d. 1979)
1904 – Cooney Weiland, Canadian ice hockey player and coach (d. 1985)
1905 – Joel McCrea, American actor (d. 1990)
  1905   – Louis Rosier, French racing driver (d. 1956)
  1905   – Sajjad Zaheer, Indian author and poet (d. 1973)
1906 – Endre Kabos, Hungarian fencer (d. 1944)
  1906   – Fred Lawrence Whipple, American astronomer and academic (d. 2004)
1910 – John Hackett, Australian-English general and academic (d. 1997)
1911 – Marie Osborne Yeats, American actress and costume designer (d. 2010)
  1911   – Roy Rogers, American singer, guitarist and actor (d. 1998)
1912 – W. Allen Wallis, American economist and statistician (d. 1998)
1913 – Guy Green, English-American director, screenwriter and cinematographer (d. 2005)
  1913   – Vivien Leigh, Indian-British actress (d. 1967)
  1913   – John McGiver, American actor (d. 1975)
1914 – Alton Tobey, American painter and illustrator (d. 2005)
1917 – Jacqueline Auriol, French pilot (d. 2000)
  1917   – Banarsi Das Gupta, Indian activist and politician, 4th Chief Minister of Haryana (d. 2007)
  1917   – James Lawton Collins Jr., American brigadier general (d. 2002)
  1917   – Giuseppe Salvioli, Italian football player
1919 – Hasan Askari, Pakistani linguist, scholar and critic (d. 1978)
  1919   – Myron Floren, American accordionist and pianist (d. 2005)
1920 – Tommy Godwin, American-English cyclist and coach (d. 2012)
  1920   – Douglass North, American economist and academic, Nobel Prize laureate (d. 2015)
1921 – Georges Cziffra, Hungarian pianist and composer (d. 1994)
  1921   – Fawzia Fuad of Egypt (d. 2013)
1922 – Violet Barclay, American illustrator (d. 2010)
  1922   – Yitzchok Scheiner, American-Israeli rabbi (d. 2021)
  1922   – Cecil H. Underwood, American educator and politician, 25th and 32nd Governor of West Virginia (d. 2008)
1923 – Rudolf Augstein, German soldier and journalist, co-founder of Der Spiegel (d. 2002)
1926 – John Berger, English author, poet, painter and critic (d. 2017)
1927 – Hirotugu Akaike, Japanese statistician (d. 2009)
1930 – Wim Bleijenberg, Dutch footballer and manager (d. 2016)
  1930   – Hans Mommsen, German historian and academic (d. 2015)
1931 – Leonard Herzenberg, American immunologist, geneticist and academic (d. 2013)
  1931   – Gil Hill, American actor, police officer and politician (d. 2016) 
  1931   – Harold McNair, Jamaican-English saxophonist and flute player (d. 1971)
  1931   – Ike Turner, American singer-songwriter, guitarist and producer (d. 2007)
  1931   – Diane Pearson, British book editor and novelist (d. 2017)
1932 – Algirdas Lauritėnas, Lithuanian basketball player (d. 2001)
1933 – Herb Edelman, American actor (d. 1996)
1934 – Jeb Stuart Magruder, American minister and civil servant (d. 2014)
1935 – Lester Piggott, English flat racing jockey and trainer (d. 2022)
  1935   – Christopher Wood, English author and screenwriter (d. 2015)
1936 – Michael Dertouzos, Greek-American computer scientist and academic (d. 2001)
  1936   – Uwe Seeler, German footballer (d. 2022)
  1936   – Billy Sherrill, American record producer, songwriter and arranger (d. 2015)
1937 – Chan Sek Keong, Singaporean lawyer, judge and politician, 3rd Chief Justice of Singapore
  1937   – Harris Yulin, American actor
1938 – Joe Dassin, American-French singer-songwriter (d. 1980)
  1938   – César Luis Menotti, Argentinian footballer and manager
  1938   – Jim Steranko, American author and illustrator
1939 – Lobsang Tenzin, Tibetan religious leader
1940 – Ted Kulongoski, American soldier, lawyer and politician, 36th Governor of Oregon
  1940   – Elke Sommer, German actress 
1941 – Art Garfunkel, American singer-songwriter and guitarist
  1941   – Yoshiyuki Tomino, Japanese animator, director and screenwriter
1942 – Pierangelo Bertoli, Italian singer-songwriter and guitarist (d. 2002)
1943 – Friedman Paul Erhardt, German-American chef and author (d. 2007)
  1943   – Percy Hobson, Australian high jumper
  1943   – Sam Shepard, American playwright and actor (d. 2017)
1945 – Peter Pace, American general
  1945   – Aleka Papariga, Greek accountant and politician
  1945   – Svetlana Tširkova-Lozovaja, Russian fencer and coach
1946 – Gram Parsons, American singer-songwriter and guitarist (d. 1973)
1947 – Quint Davis, American director and producer
  1947   – Peter Noone, English singer-songwriter and guitarist
1948 – Bob Barr, American lawyer and politician
  1948   – Peter Hammill, English singer-songwriter, guitarist and producer 
  1948   – Bernard-Henri Lévy, French philosopher and author
  1948   – William Daniel Phillips, American physicist and academic, Nobel Prize laureate
1949 – Armin Shimerman, American actor
  1949   – Jimmie Spheeris, American singer-songwriter (d. 1984)
1950 – Thorbjørn Jagland, Norwegian politician, 25th Prime Minister of Norway
  1950   – James Kennedy, American psychologist and author
1952 – Oleh Blokhin, Ukrainian footballer and manager
  1952   – Vandana Shiva, Indian philosopher and author
1953 – Joyce Maynard, American journalist, author and academic
1954 – Alejandro Sabella, Argentine footballer and manager (d. 2020) 
  1954   – Jeffrey Sachs, American economist and academic
1955 – Bernard Chazelle, French computer scientist and academic
  1955   – Kris Jenner, American talent manager and businesswoman 
  1955   – Karan Thapar, Indian journalist and author
1956 – Jeff Watson, American guitarist and songwriter
  1956   – John Harwood, American journalist
  1956   – Lavrentis Machairitsas, Greek singer-songwriter and guitarist
  1956   – Michael Sorridimi, Australian rugby league player
  1956   – Rob Fisher, English keyboard player and songwriter (d. 1999)
1957 – Mike Score, English singer-songwriter and keyboard player 
1958 – Don Falcone, American keyboard player, songwriter and producer 
  1958   – Mo Gaffney, American actress and screenwriter
  1958   – Robert Patrick, American actor 
1959 – Bryan Adams, Canadian singer-songwriter, guitarist, producer and actor
  1959   – Tomo Česen, Slovenian mountaineer
1960 – René Froger, Dutch singer-songwriter
  1960   – Tilda Swinton, English actress 
1961 – Alan G. Poindexter, American captain, pilot and astronaut (d. 2012)
1962 – Turid Birkeland, Norwegian businesswoman and politician, Norwegian Minister of Culture (d. 2015)
  1962   – Abedi Pele, Ghanaian footballer and manager
  1962   – Marcus J. Ranum, American computer scientist and author
1963 – Hans Gillhaus, Dutch footballer and scout
  1963   – Andrea McArdle, American actress and singer
  1963   – Tatum O'Neal, American actress and author
  1963   – Brian Wheat, American bass player and songwriter 
  1963   – Jean-Pierre Papin, French footballer and manager
1965 – Atul Gawande, American surgeon and journalist
  1965   – Famke Janssen, Dutch model and actress
1966 – Nayim, Spanish footballer and manager
  1966   – James Allen, English journalist and sportscaster
  1966   – Urmas Kirs, Estonian footballer and manager
1967 – Judy Reyes, American actress and producer
1968 – Ricardo Fort, Argentinian actor, director and businessman (d. 2013)
  1968   – Sam Rockwell, American actor 
1969 – Pat Kilbane, American actor, comedian, director and screenwriter
1970 – Javy López, Puerto Rican-American baseball player
1971 – Sergei Berezin, Russian ice hockey player
  1971   – Jonny Greenwood, English guitarist and songwriter 
  1971   – Rob Jones, Welsh-English footballer and coach
  1971   – Corin Nemec, American actor, producer and screenwriter
  1971   – Mårten Olander, Swedish golfer
1973 – Alexei Yashin, Russian ice hockey player and manager
1974 – Ryan Adams, American singer-songwriter and guitarist 
  1974   – Angela Gossow, German singer-songwriter 
  1974   – Dado Pršo, Croatian footballer and coach
  1974   – Taine Randell, New Zealand rugby player
  1974   – Jerry Stackhouse, American basketball player and sportscaster
1975 – Lisa Scott-Lee, Welsh singer-songwriter 
1976 – Mr. Fastfinger, Finnish guitarist and songwriter
1977 – Maarten Tjallingii, Dutch cyclist
  1977   – Richard Wright, English footballer and coach
1978 – Xavier Tondo, Spanish cyclist (d. 2011)
  1978   – Bubba Watson, American golfer
1979 – Romi Dames, Japanese-American actress
  1979   – Michalis Hatzigiannis, Cypriot singer-songwriter and producer
  1979   – Keith McLeod, American basketball player
  1979   – David Suazo, Honduran footballer and coach
1980 – Jaime Camara, Brazilian racing driver
  1980   – Andrei Korobeinik, Estonian computer programmer, businessman and politician
  1980   – Christoph Metzelder, German footballer
  1980   – Orkun Uşak, Turkish footballer
1981 – Paul Chapman, Australian footballer
  1981   – Ümit Ergirdi, Turkish footballer
1982 – Leah Culver, American computer scientist and programmer, co-founder of Pownce
  1982   – Bryan LaHair, American baseball player
  1982   – Rob Swire, Australian singer-songwriter, guitarist and producer 
  1982   – Matthew Williams, Welsh footballer
1983 – Alexa Chung, English model and television host
  1983   – Mike Hanke, German footballer
  1983   – Juan Morillo, Dominican baseball player
1984 – Jon Cornish, Canadian football player
  1984   – Tobias Enström, Swedish ice hockey player
  1984   – Baruto Kaito, Estonian sumo wrestler
  1984   – Eliud Kipchoge, Kenyan long-distance runner
  1984   – John Sutton, Australian rugby league player
  1984   – Nick Tandy, English racing driver
  1984   – Nikolay Zherdev, Ukrainian-Russian ice hockey player
1985 – Michel Butter, Dutch runner
  1985   – Kate DeAraugo, Australian singer-songwriter 
1986 – BoA, South Korean singer-songwriter, producer and actress
  1986   – Ian Mahinmi, American basketball player
  1986   – Kasper Schmeichel, Danish footballer
  1986   – Nodiko Tatishvili, Georgian singer
1987 – Kevin Jonas, American singer-songwriter, guitarist and actor 
1988 – Virat Kohli, Indian cricketer
1991 – Flume, Australian DJ and producer 
  1991   – Shōdai Naoya, Japanese sumo wrestler
1992 – Odell Beckham Jr., American football player
  1992   – Marco Verratti, Italian footballer
1993 – Hideya Tawada, Japanese actor and model

Deaths

Pre-1600
 425 – Atticus, archbishop of Constantinople
 964 – Fan Zhi, chancellor of the Song Dynasty (b. 911)
1011 – Mathilde, Abbess of Essen (b. 949)
1176 – Diego Martínez de Villamayor, Castilian nobleman 
1235 – Elisabeth of Swabia, queen consort of Castile and León (b. 1205)
1370 – Casimir III the Great, Polish king (b. 1310)
1450 – John IV, Count of Armagnac (b. 1396)
1459 – John Fastolf, English soldier (b. 1380)
1515 – Mariotto Albertinelli, Italian painter and educator (b. 1474)
1559 – Kanō Motonobu, Japanese painter and educator (b. 1476)

1601–1900
1605 – Nyaungyan Min, Birmese king (b. 1555)
1660 – Alexandre de Rhodes, French missionary and lexicographer (b. 1591)
  1660   – Lucy Hay, Countess of Carlisle (b. 1599)
1701 – Charles Gerard, 2nd Earl of Macclesfield, French-English colonel and politician, Lord Lieutenant of Lancashire (b. 1659)
1714 – Bernardino Ramazzini, Italian physician and academic (b. 1633)
1752 – Carl Andreas Duker, German scholar and jurist (b. 1670)
1758 – Hans Egede, Norwegian-Danish bishop and missionary (b. 1686)
1807 – Angelica Kauffman, painter (b. 1741)
1872 – Thomas Sully, English-American painter (b. 1783)
1876 – Theodor von Heuglin, German explorer and ornithologist (b. 1824)
1879 – James Clerk Maxwell, Scottish physicist and mathematician (b. 1831)

1901–present
1923 – Jacques d'Adelswärd-Fersen, French author and poet (b. 1880)
1928 – Vlasios Tsirogiannis, Greek general (b. 1872)
1930 – Christiaan Eijkman, Dutch physician and pathologist, Nobel Prize  laureate (b. 1858)
  1930   – Luigi Facta, Italian politician, journalist and Prime Minister of Italy (b. 1861)
1931 – Konrad Stäheli, Swiss target shooter (b. 1866)
1933 – Texas Guinan, American actress and businesswoman (b. 1884)
  1933   – Walther von Dyck, German mathematician and academic (b. 1856)
1938 – Thomas Dewing, American painter and educator (b. 1851)
1939 – Mary W. Bacheler, American physician and Baptist medical missionary (b. 1860)
1941 – Arndt Pekurinen, Finnish activist (b. 1905)
1942 – George M. Cohan, American actor, singer, composer, author and theatre manager/owner (b. 1878)
1944 – Alexis Carrel, French surgeon and biologist, Nobel Prize laureate (b. 1873)
1946 – Joseph Stella, Italian-American painter (b. 1877)
1950 – Mary Harris Armor, American suffragist (b. 1863)
1951 – Reggie Walker, South African runner (b. 1889)
1955 – Maurice Utrillo, French painter (b. 1883)
1956 – Art Tatum, American pianist and composer (b. 1909)
1960 – Ward Bond, American actor (b. 1903)
  1960   – Donald Grey Barnhouse, American pastor and theologian (b. 1895)
  1960   – August Gailit, Estonian author and poet (b. 1891)
  1960   – Johnny Horton, American singer-songwriter and guitarist (b. 1925)
  1960   – Mack Sennett, Canadian-American actor, director, producer, and screenwriter (b. 1880)
1963 – Luis Cernuda, Spanish poet and critic (b. 1902)
1964 – Buddy Cole, American pianist and conductor (b. 1916)
  1964   – Lansdale Ghiselin Sasscer, American lieutenant, lawyer, and politician (b. 1893)
1971 – Sam Jones, American baseball player (b. 1925)
1972 – Alfred Schmidt, Estonian weightlifter (b. 1898)
1975 – Edward Lawrie Tatum, American geneticist and academic, Nobel Prize laureate (b. 1909)
  1975   – Lionel Trilling, American critic, essayist, short story writer, and educator (b. 1905)
1977 – René Goscinny, French author and illustrator (b. 1926)
  1977   – Guy Lombardo, Canadian-American violinist and conductor (b. 1902)
  1977   – Alexey Stakhanov, Russian-Soviet miner, the Stakhanovite movement has been named after him (b. 1906) 
1979 – Al Capp, American cartoonist (b. 1909)
1980 – Louis Alter, American musician (b. 1902)
1981 – Rangjung Rigpe Dorje, 16th Karmapa, Tibetan spiritual leader (b. 1924)
1985 – Arnold Chikobava, Georgian linguist and philologist (b. 1898)
  1985   – Spencer W. Kimball, American religious leader, 12th President of The Church of Jesus Christ of Latter-day Saints (b. 1895)
1986 – Adolf Brudes, German race car driver (b. 1899)
  1986   – Claude Jutra, Canadian actor, director, and screenwriter (b. 1930)
  1986   – Bobby Nunn, American singer (b. 1925)
1987 – Eamonn Andrews, Irish radio and television host (b. 1922)
1989 – Vladimir Horowitz, Ukrainian-American pianist and composer (b. 1903)
1991 – Robert Maxwell, Czech-English captain, publisher, and politician (b. 1923)
  1991   – Fred MacMurray, American actor and businessman (b. 1908)
1992 – Adile Ayda, Russian-Turkish engineer and diplomat (b. 1912)
  1992   – Arpad Elo, American physicist and chess player (b. 1903)
1996 – Eddie Harris, American saxophonist (b. 1934)
1997 – James Robert Baker, American author and screenwriter (b. 1946)
  1997   – Isaiah Berlin, Latvian-English historian, author, and academic (b. 1909)
  1997   – Peter Jackson, Australian rugby league player and sportscaster (b. 1964)
1999 – James Goldstone, American director and screenwriter (b. 1931)
  1999   – Colin Rowe, English-American architect, theorist and academic (b. 1920)
2000 – Jimmie Davis, American singer-songwriter and politician, 47th Governor of Louisiana (b. 1899)
  2000   – Bibi Titi Mohammed, Tanzanian politician (b. 1926)
2001 – Roy Boulting, English director and producer (b. 1913)
  2001   – Milton William Cooper, American radio host, author, and activist (b. 1943)
2003 – Bobby Hatfield, American singer-songwriter (b. 1940)
2004 – Donald Jones, American-Dutch actor, singer, and dancer (b. 1932)
2005 – John Fowles, English novelist (b. 1926)
  2005   – Virginia MacWatters, American soprano and actress (b. 1912)
  2005   – Link Wray, American singer-songwriter and guitarist (b. 1929)
2006 – Bülent Ecevit, Turkish journalist and politician, 16th Prime Minister of Turkey (b. 1925)
2007 – Nils Liedholm, Swedish footballer and manager (b. 1922)
2009 – Félix Luna, Argentinian lawyer, historian, and academic (b. 1925)
2010 – Jill Clayburgh, American actress and singer (b. 1944)
  2010   – Adrian Păunescu, Romanian poet, journalist, and politician (b. 1943)
  2010   – Shirley Verrett, American soprano and actress (b. 1931)
2011 – Bhupen Hazarika, Indian singer-songwriter, director, and poet (b. 1926)
2012 – Olympe Bradna, French-American actress and dancer (b. 1920)
  2012   – Elliott Carter, American composer and academic (b. 1908)
  2012   – Leonardo Favio, Argentinian actor, singer, director and screenwriter (b. 1938)
  2012   – Bob Kaplan, Canadian lawyer and politician, 30th Solicitor General of Canada (b. 1936)
  2012   – Louis Pienaar, South African lawyer and diplomat, Minister of Internal Affairs (b. 1926)
2013 – Habibollah Asgaroladi, Iranian politician (b. 1932)
  2013   – Juan Carlos Calabró, Argentinian actor and screenwriter (b. 1934)
  2013   – Tony Iveson, English soldier and pilot (b. 1919)
  2013   – Charles Mosley, English genealogist and author (b. 1948)
  2013   – Charlie Trotter, American chef and author (b. 1959)
  2013   – Stuart Williams, Welsh footballer and manager (b. 1930)
2014 – Manitas de Plata, French guitarist (b. 1921)
  2014   – Lane Evans, American lawyer and politician (b. 1951)
  2014   – Wally Grant, American ice hockey player (b. 1927)
  2014   – Abdelwahab Meddeb, Tunisian-French author, poet, and scholar (b. 1946)
2015 – George Barris, American engineer and car designer (b. 1925)
  2015   – Nora Brockstedt, Norwegian singer (b. 1923)
  2015   – Soma Edirisinghe, Sri Lankan businesswoman and philanthropist (b. 1939)
  2015   – Czesław Kiszczak, Polish general and politician, 11th Prime Minister of the People's Republic of Poland (b. 1925)
  2015   – Hans Mommsen, German historian and academic (b. 1930)
2020 – Geoffrey Palmer, English actor (b. 1927)
2021 – Marília Mendonça, Brazilian singer (b. 1995)
2022 – Aaron Carter, American singer-songwriter, rapper, dancer and actor (b. 1987)

Holidays and observances
 Christian feast day:
All Jesuit Saints and Blesseds
 Domninus
 Elizabeth, the mother of John the Baptist
 Galation
 Guido Maria Conforti
 Magnus
 November 5 (Eastern Orthodox liturgics)
 Bank Transfer Day (United States) 
 Colón Day (Panama) 
 Guy Fawkes Night (United Kingdom, New Zealand and Newfoundland and Labrador, Canada), and its related observances:
 West Country Carnival (English West Country)
Cinco de noviembre (Negros, Philippines)
 Kanakadasa Jayanthi (Karnataka, India)

References

External links

 
 
 

Days of the year
November